The Langesundsfjord, also known as the Breviksfjord, is a stretch of fjord from northern Skagerrak, between the islands of Sandøya, Bjørkøya and Siktesøya in Porsgrunn municipality and the mainland of Bamble municipality, in Telemark county in the southeastern part of Norway.

Location
The fjord stretches from the strait  Langesund  until Brevik, where it separates into the Frierfjord  and the Eidangerfjord. In the mediaeval period the fjord was named Grenmar, after the grener people who lived here and mar which was Old Norse for sea. Later, well into the 1700s, the entire stretch from Langesund gap and up to Skien was referred to as Langesundsfjord.

Langesundsfjorden is especially noted for the discovery of fluorescent  minerals.  Many of the minerals found here are relatively rare. Commercial quarrying for decorative stone started in the late 1880s. In 1881, Diderik Cappelen (1856-1935), first found Cappelenite in Langesundsfjorden. Cappelenite, which he discovered in small veins within Nepheline syenite  pegmatite, is a rare  yttrium-barium  borosilicate. It is found in the form of greenish-brown hexagonal crystals.

Brevik Bridge is a bridge over the mouth of the Frierfjord that connects the municipalities of Bamble and Porsgrunn. On the West side of Bamble lies Stathelle, while on the East side lies Brevik in Porsgrunn. Brevik tunnel (Brevikstunnelen) on Highway 354 (old E18) goes through the hill in Brevik and connects the Brevik bridge with the rest of the way north.

Gallery of Brevik Bridge

See also
Grenland

References

Other sources
 Larsen, Alf Olav (ed.) (2010)  The Langesundsfjord – History, Geology, Pegmatites, Minerals (Salzhemmendorf, Germany: Bode Verlag GmbH)  
Ramberg, I.B., Bryhni, I., Nottvedt, A. & Rangnes, K. (eds) (2008) The Making of a Land: The Geology of Norway (Geographical Society of Norway)

External links
Langesundsfjord

Porsgrunn
Fjords of Vestfold og Telemark